Ether Or is a live performance album by SubArachnoid Space, released in April 1997 by Unit Circle Rekkids.

Track listing

Personnel 
Adapted from the Ether Or liner notes.

SubArachnoid Space
 Melynda Jackson – guitar
 Mason Jones – guitar, bass guitar
 Michelle Schreiber – drums

Additional musicians
 Chris Van Huffel – percussion (2)
 Michelle Marcoccia – didgeridoo (1, 7)

Release history

References

External links 
 Ether Or at Discogs (list of releases)

1997 live albums
SubArachnoid Space albums